Social Call is an album by Betty Carter featuring Ray Bryant and a big band arranged by Gigi Gryce. Of its eleven tracks, the first six were recorded in 1955 and originally released as part of the album Meet Betty Carter and Ray Bryant. The other five tracks were recorded in 1956 but remained unissued until this compilation, which Columbia Records released in 1980.

Track listing
"Moonlight in Vermont" (John Blackburn, Karl Suessdorf)  – 3:23
"Thou Swell" (Lorenz Hart, Richard Rodgers)  – 1:39
"I Could Write a Book" (Hart, Rodgers)  – 2:37
"Gone with the Wind" (Herbert Magidson, Allie Wrubel)  – 4:10
"The Way You Look Tonight" (Dorothy Fields, Jerome Kern)  – 2:42
"Can't We Be Friends?(Paul James, Kay Swift)  – 2:25
"Tell Him I Said Hello" (Jack J. Canning, Bill Hagner)  – 2:32
"Social Call" (Gigi Gryce, Jon Hendricks)  – 2:37
"Runaway" (Cy Coleman)  – 2:28
"Frenesi" (Alberto Domínguez, Leonard Whitcup)  – 2:29
"Let's Fall in Love" (Harold Arlen, Ted Koehler)  – 1:57

Personnel 
Recorded May 13 & 16, 1955, New York City, New York, USA (tracks 1-6):

 Betty Carter - vocals
 Ray Bryant - piano
 Jerome Richardson - flute, saxophone
 Wendell Marshall - double bass
 Jo Jones - drums

Recorded April 25, 1956 (tracks 7-11):

 Betty Carter - vocals
 Gigi Gryce - arranger and leader
 Bernie Glow, Nick Travis, Conte Candoli, Joe Ferrante - trumpet
 Urbie Green, Jimmy Cleveland - trombone
 Sam Marowitz, Al Cohn, Seldon Powell, Danny Bank - saxophone
 Hank Jones - piano
 Milt Hinton - double bass
 Osie Johnson - drums

References

1980 albums
Albums arranged by Gigi Gryce
Betty Carter albums
Columbia Records albums